BC Clark Jewelers is a full-service jeweler that currently operates three stores in Oklahoma City, Oklahoma. The company, founded in Purcell, Indian Territory in 1892, claims to be "Oklahoma's oldest jeweler." Today, the company operates three locations in Oklahoma City.

BC Clark is most well known for its "Anniversary Sale" jingle, which was originally created in 1956. The jingle is played in advertisements for the retailer's five-week advertising campaign during the holiday shopping season, always starting during the evening on Thanksgiving Day. According to the company, the jingle "may be the longest continuously running jingle in the entire United States." The jingle is seen as somewhat of a local holiday tradition by many from the Oklahoma City area who are used to hearing the mid-1950s recording during the holidays.

References

External links
 BC Clark Jewelers
 BC Clark 4K TV ad with holiday jingle

Jewelry retailers of the United States
American companies established in 1892
Retail companies established in 1892
Companies based in Oklahoma City